Zir Ab may refer to:

 Zirab, a city in Mazardaran Province, Iran
 Zir Ab, Fars, a village in Fars Province, Iran
 Zir Ab, Khuzestan, a village in Khuzestan Province, Iran
 Zir Ab, Razavi Khorasan, a village in Razavi Khorasan Province, Iran
 Zir Ab (ruins), ruins in Isfahan Province, Iran